Life on Mars is an American crime drama television series which originally aired on ABC from October 9, 2008 to April 1, 2009. It is an adaptation of the BAFTA-winning original British series of the same title produced by the BBC. The series was co-produced by Kudos Film and Television, 20th Television, and ABC Signature.

The series tells the story of New York City police detective Sam Tyler (played by Jason O'Mara), who, after being struck by a car in 2008, regains consciousness in 1973. Fringing between multiple genres, including thriller, science fiction and police procedural, the series remained ambiguous regarding its central plot, with the character himself unsure about his situation. The series also starred Harvey Keitel, Jonathan Murphy, Michael Imperioli, and Gretchen Mol.

Life on Mars garnered critical praise for its premise, acting, and depiction of the 1970s. Shortly after its premiere, the show's momentum was interrupted by a two-month hiatus followed by a timeslot change which led to a decline in viewership. On March 2, 2009 ABC announced that it would not be ordering a second season. A DVD set of the complete series was released on September 29, 2009.

Synopsis 
The protagonist of the series is Detective Sam Tyler, assigned to the 125th Precinct Detective Squad of the New York City Police Department.

At the show's outset in 2008, he cohabits with his girlfriend who is also his NYPD assigned partner, Detective Maya Daniels. Maya, to Tyler's horror, is kidnapped by a murderer they are investigating. While responding to a radio call as he crosses the street, Tyler is distracted and hit by another responding speeding police car. He regains consciousness in the same spot in the year 1973, dressed in period civilian attire, carrying a period-accurate identity card with his badge, and equipped with a vintage automobile, a 1971 Chevrolet Chevelle — and, astonishingly, he's parked within sight of the Twin Towers of the World Trade Center. He returns to his precinct house to find an unfamiliar early-1970s police squad, with contemporaneous equipment - rotary dial telephones, reel-to-reel tape recorders, typewriters - and culture which he likens to finding himself on a different planet. However, the detectives have been expecting him, thinking that he is a transfer from a place called "Hyde". His disorientation and frequent reference to things from the future brand him as eccentric, being labeled with the nickname "Spaceman", but he becomes a valued member of the squad.

Later on in the series, with Sam supposedly in a coma in 2008, Maya decided to end the relationship.

Several of the show's plots involve Sam looking into earlier versions of his cases from 2008, such as in "Out Here in the Fields" where he discovers the sociopath mentor of a future serial killer, and in "The Simple Secret of the Note in Us All" where Sam has the opportunity to stop a serial killer early in his career. Additional storylines are driven by the conflict between Sam's 2008 values and the more corrupt, almost vigilante-style policing of the era he finds himself in, while others are driven by Sam's discovery of more personal information about his past in this era that radically reshapes his understanding of the life he's left behind. He engages in an ongoing struggle to figure out what has happened to him, torn between his developing relationships in 1973 and his desire to return to 2008.

His 2008 reality frequently intrudes into 1973 through surreal, anachronistic visions and cryptic telephone calls. In one episode he sees a man in a nightclub wearing a Nirvana T-shirt, in several early episodes he sees the face of George W. Bush on the front page of the newspaper, and he frequently sees Mars rover robots following him or attempting to enter his body.

At other times, he also hints at his knowledge of the future to his colleagues; in a discussion of then-President Richard Nixon he confuses them by asserting that Nixon won't be in office much longer, he makes a veiled allusion to the September 11 attacks when advising them against engaging in hate speech, and he uses then-future cultural references as undercover pseudonyms — sometimes giving his name as "Luke Skywalker", "Tom Cruise" or "Sam Bono", and giving Gene and a female companion the undercover names "George and Laura Bush".

At the end of the series, it is revealed that Tyler's 2008 and 1973 realities were both fictitious, created by the onboard computer of a spacecraft that is carrying Tyler, Hunt, Norris, Carling, and Skelton on the first ever human mission to the planet Mars, in 2035. The crew he worked with in 1973 were just virtual reality versions of his fellow spaceship crewmembers. His room number, "2B", is his sleeping unit; his old precinct, "Hyde", and his new precinct, the "125", are based on the name of the spacecraft — "Hyde 125"; his neighbor, Windy, is the name of the computer A.I.; Frank Morgan, an FBI agent in the series, is the Mission Control flight director; in a reversal from her struggle to be taken seriously as a police officer in 1973, Annie Norris is the ship's commander. To sustain the crew, their minds were routinely kept active while asleep using virtual reality "neural stimulation" programs of their own choosing, but Sam's choice of a scenario where he was a police officer c. 2008 was abruptly changed to a 1973 setting by a computer glitch induced by a meteor-storm. The identity of Maya in 2035, however, is left unexplained. In a twist, Gene Hunt in 1973 turns out to be astronaut 'Major Tom' Tyler — Sam's father — in the conclusion. Just as Maria was estranged from Gene in 1973, Sam was estranged from his father until the very end of the series, when he reconciles with his dad before they step out onto the bare ground of the Red Planet. However the final shot shows, not an astronaut boot, but Gene Hunt's signature white loafer taking the first step onto the Martian surface, casting doubt once again onto the ending.

Cast

Main 

Jason O'Mara as Sam Tyler, who is struck by a car in 2008 and awakes in 1973, often finding his modern values conflicting with 1973 culture.
Michael Imperioli as Ray Carling, an ambitious and short-tempered detective.
Gretchen Mol as Annie Norris, a policewoman who has aspirations of making the detective squad and struggles against sexist attitudes about policewomen in the 70s.
Jonathan Murphy as Chris Skelton, a kind but naive junior detective.
Harvey Keitel as Gene Hunt, the hardened commander of the detectives.

Recurring 

Maggie Siff as Maria Hunt Belanger, a social worker who assists when a young child is a witness to a crime.  She is romantically involved with Sam for a brief time during the series, and turns out to be Gene Hunt's daughter.
John Cenatiempo as Sizable Ted, a fellow detective known for his strong physical appearance.
Tanya Fischer as Windy, a free-spirited hippie neighbor of Sam's.
Lisa Bonet as Maya Daniels, Sam's professional and personal partner in 2008.
Jennifer Ferrin as Rose Tyler, Sam's mother who struggles to make ends meet.
Dean Winters as Vic Tyler, Sam's father in 1973.
Edi Gathegi/Clarke Peters as Fletcher Bellow, a young African-American detective.
Peter Gerety as Franklin Morgan, an agent set to Sam's precinct when one of Sam's missions fails.
Michael Bertolini as Colin Raimes, a suspected serial killer.
Peter Greene as Jimmy McManus, an Irish gang leader in New York.

Production 
David E. Kelley was the initial writer and executive producer of the series pilot, but later handed over production responsibilities to others. The executive producers of the show were Josh Appelbaum, André Nemec, and Scott Rosenberg, the producers of the ABC drama October Road.

After reviewing the pilot episode, ABC ordered an overhaul. Several members of the cast and crew were replaced, with production moved from Los Angeles to New York to allow producers to take advantage of recently enacted local and state tax credits for shows filmed in that state. The setting of the series was also changed from Los Angeles to New York, taking place at the fictional 125th precinct of the New York City Police Department (NYPD).

The script was rewritten, with permission of the original creators, to remove the "unsatisfying" ambiguity of Sam's story in favor of a "mythological element" and "deeper mystery".

The series premiered in North America on October 9, 2008, on ABC, following Grey's Anatomy. Internationally, it also aired on Global in Canada, on FX in the UK, and on Network Ten in Australia. On November 20, 2008, ABC ordered four additional episodes to the show's original thirteen episodes. After its winter hiatus, the series was shifted to a Wednesday night timeslot on January 28, 2009, following Lost.

On March 2, 2009, it was announced that ABC would not be ordering a second season. The cancellation decision came early enough to allow producers time to wrap up the show's storyline. The network aired all 17 episodes ordered, with the final episode airing April 1, 2009.

Episodes

Reception

Commentary 
In a UK interview with SFX, Matthew Graham—co-creator of the original Life on Mars—was asked his opinion on the US remake. His opinion was "Have you seen it? It beggars belief, doesn't it?" He goes on to speak of how he discussed future Ashes to Ashes endings and theories with the US team, stating they thought the UK ending "wasn't extreme enough". He spoke of how strong endings should be there for the viewer to work out, whereas the US ending was like "coming up with something and going 'Hey-hey, you never knew this, but Gene is a Martian!, which he felt was a mistake.

U.S. ratings

References

External links 
 

American Broadcasting Company original programming
American television series based on British television series
2008 American television series debuts
2009 American television series endings
2000s American crime drama television series
2000s American police procedural television series
Television series set in the 1970s
Fiction set in 1973
Television series set in 1973
Television series by 20th Century Fox Television
Television series by ABC Studios
Television series by Endemol
Television shows about virtual reality
Fictional portrayals of the New York City Police Department
English-language television shows
Television series created by Josh Appelbaum and André Nemec
Life on Mars (franchise)
American time travel television series
Television shows set in New York City
2000s American time travel television series